Final table of the 1991-1992 season of the French Championship of Rugby League.

Final table

Group A

Group B

Final

References

External links
 1991-1992 ranking

Rugby league competitions in France
French Championship season
French Championship season
Championship season (rugby league)